Thorybes drusius, the drusius cloudywing, is a species of dicot skipper in the butterfly family Hesperiidae. It is found in Central America and North America.

The MONA or Hodges number for Thorybes drusius is 3914.

References

Further reading

 

Thorybes
Articles created by Qbugbot
Butterflies of North America
Butterflies of Central America
Butterflies described in 1884
Taxa named by William Henry Edwards